Gerri Willis is an American television news journalist and former host of The Willis Report, a daytime program on Fox Business, focusing on consumer and personal finance issues.

Early life and education
Gerri Willis was born on August 14, 1959, in Spruce Pine, North Carolina. She is a graduate of Columbia Business School and Miami University located in Oxford, Ohio where she was a Knight-Bagehot Fellow. While attending Miami, she was also the Business Manager of The Miami Student, the oldest college newspaper in the U.S.

Career
Prior to joining Fox Business, Willis served as the personal finance editor for CNN, hosting a weekly half-hour program titled Your Bottom Line, which focused on ways to save Americans money and the economy's effects on personal finance. Before CNN, she worked at Smart Money magazine as the senior financial correspondent. She joined the Fox Business Network in March 2010, appearing across all programming on the network. Willis is the author of two business books, The Smart Money Guide to Real Estate Investing and Home Rich. She was also the winner of the Excellence in Retirement Savings Reporting award in 2001, which is bestowed by the American University School of Communication and the Investment Company Institute's Education Foundation.

Personal life
Willis married David Evans in 1994. In May 2016, Willis announced her breast cancer diagnosis after discovering an abnormality and seeing her physician in April. Nearly a year later, she indicated that dealing with the cancer has been a blessing, and has reconnected her with her faith. By October 2017, she had undergone a mastectomy, four months of chemotherapy, and five weeks of daily radiation treatment. In an interview with Westchester Magazine that same month, she announced she had been in remission since the start of the year. On January 28, 2020, it was announced that Willis would take a leave of absence as she undergoes surgery to address pre-cancer cells.

References

External links
 
 

1959 births
21st-century American non-fiction writers
21st-century American women writers
American business and financial journalists
American business writers
American television news anchors
American women television journalists
CNN people
Fox Business people
Journalists from North Carolina
Journalists from Ohio
Living people
Miami University alumni
People from Butler County, Ohio
People from Spruce Pine, North Carolina
Women business and financial journalists